Robert Michael Carter (born 25 May 1960 in King's Lynn, England) is a former cricketer who played 60 first-class and 55 List A games between 1978 and 1984-85 for Northamptonshire and Canterbury.
He is currently head coach of the New Zealand women's cricket team.

References

1960 births
Living people
Canterbury cricketers
Cricketers from King's Lynn
English cricket coaches
English cricketers
Northamptonshire cricketers